Juliet Kepes, née Appleby, (1919–1999) was a British illustrator, painter and sculptor.

Life 
Kepes studied at Brighton School in the 1930s, and met her future husband, György Kepes in Shaftesbury Avenue in 1936. When in 1937, György was offered a teaching position at the New Bauhaus in Chicago – Juliet went with him to study, while he taught. In later life, they moved to Cambridge, Massachusetts – again for György's work.

Professional work 
In the early 1950s, Kepes began writing and illustrating children’s book. Her first work was published in 1952 and was titled Five Little Monkeys. The work was good enough to win a Caldecott Medal honour in 1953, missing out on the medal to The Biggest Bear by Lynd Ward.

Bibliography 
 Five Little Monkeys (1952) - author and illustrator
 Laughing Time (1953) – illustrator
 The Seven Remarkable Bears (1954) – illustrator
 Beasts from a Brush (1955) – author and illustrator
 Boy Blue’s Book of Beasts (1957) – illustrator
 Frogs Merry (1961) – author and illustrator
 Five Little Monkey Business (1965) - author and illustrator

References 

1919 births
1999 deaths
20th-century British women artists
British illustrators
Alumni of the University of Brighton
Burials at Mount Auburn Cemetery